Alayna Westcom (born May 19, 1991) is an American beauty pageant titleholder from Bakersfield, Vermont, who was crowned Miss Vermont 2015. She competed for the Miss America 2016 title in September 2015. Westcom placed outside the Top 15 but was awarded a Non-Finalist Talent scholarship.

Early life and education
Westcom is a native of Bakersfield, Vermont, and daughter of David and Katherine Westcom. She has two siblings, Kayla and Jaren. Westcom is a 2009 graduate of Bellows Free Academy. She graduated from Bay Path College in 2013 with a bachelor of science degree in forensic science. She completed post-baccalaureate classes in medical laboratory science at the University of Vermont in 2014 and 2015.

She is currently an autopsy technician at The University of Vermont Medical Center and a medical technologist at Northwestern Medical Center in St. Albans, Vermont.

Pageant career

Vying for Miss Vermont
Westcom first entered the Miss Vermont pageant in 2010 on a platform of "Building Bonds In the Community" with a dance performance to "Piragua" from the musical In the Heights. In 2011, Westcom was the fourth runner-up out of 11 competitors for the Miss Vermont title. She also earned the Miss America Scholar Award during the pageant. Her 2012 entry was the last on the community platform and in 2013 she began her "Success through STEM" campaign. In 2014, Westcom was one of 12 competitors for the Miss Vermont crown but failed to place. 2014 saw her drop her dance routine in favor of an on-stage science demonstration.

Miss Vermont 2015
In 2015, after an on-stage evening of talent, swimsuit, and evening wear competitions, Westcom won the Miss Vermont pageant on Saturday, April 25, 2015, when she received her crown from outgoing Miss Vermont titleholder Lucy Edwards.  Westcom also won the People's Choice Award and earned the Miracle Maker Award as the top fundraiser for the pageant's designated charity, the Children's Miracle Network Hospitals. Her duties as Miss Vermont include appearances and other functions across the state.

Vying for Miss America 2016
Westcom was Vermont's representative at the Miss America 2016 pageant in Atlantic City, New Jersey, in September 2015. Westcom's platform was "Success through STEM: Science, Technology, Engineering and Mathematics". Her talent performance was a scientific demonstration using yeast and hydrogen peroxide to create a dramatic tower of foam on stage. In the televised finale on September 13, 2015, she placed outside the Top 15 semi-finalists and was eliminated from competition. She was awarded a $3,000 scholarship prize as her state's representative. In addition, Westcom was awarded a $1,000 Non-Finalist Talent scholarship for her monologue and STEM performance.

References

External links

Miss Vermont official website

Living people
1991 births
American beauty pageant winners
Miss America 2016 delegates
People from Bakersfield, Vermont
University of Vermont alumni
Bay Path University alumni
Beauty pageant contestants from Vermont